Religions et religion was an 1880 political tract by  Victor Hugo supporting belief in God but attacking organized religion.

Works by Victor Hugo